Novokulundinka is a rural locality (a settlement) and the administrative center of Novokulundinsky Selsoviet, Blagoveshchensky District, Altai Krai, Russia. The population was 490 as of 2013. It was founded in 1923. There are 3 streets.

Geography 
Novokulundinka is located 42 km northeast of Blagoveshchenka (the district's administrative centre) by road. Dolinka is the nearest rural locality.

References 

Rural localities in Blagoveshchensky District, Altai Krai